A peculiarity of Venetian grammar is a "semi-analytical" verbal flexion, with a compulsory "clitic subject pronoun" before the verb in many sentences, "echoing" the subject as an ending or a weak pronoun. As will be clear from the examples below, Venetian subject clitics are neither "redundant" nor "pleonastic" because they provide specific information, not present on verbal endings. Independent/emphatic pronouns (e.g. ti), on the contrary, are optional.

 Italian: (Tu) eri sporco  ("You were dirty").
 Venetian: (Ti) te jèra onto or even Ti te jèri/xeri onto (lit. "(You) you were dirty").
 Italian: Il cane era sporco  ("The dog was dirty").
 Venetian: El can el jèra onto  (lit. "The dog he was dirty").
 Italian: (Tu) ti sei domandato ("You have asked yourself").
 Venetian: (Ti) te te à/gà/ghè domandà  (lit. "(You) you yourself have asked").

The clitic subject pronoun (te, el/ła, i/łe) is used with the 2nd and 3rd person singular, and with the 3rd person plural.  This feature may have arisen as a compensation for the fact that the 2nd- and 3rd-person inflections for most verbs, which are still distinct in Italian and many other Romance languages, are identical in Venetian. (The Piedmontese language also has clitic subject pronouns, but the rules are somewhat different.)

The function of clitics is particularly visible in long sentences, which do not always have clear intonational breaks to easily tell apart vocative and imperative in sharp commands from exclamations with "shouted indicative". In Venetian the clitic el marks the indicative verb and its masculine subject, otherwise there is an imperative preceded by a vocative:

 Venetian: Marco 'l canta ben, dai! ("Mark (subj.) sings well, you have to admit it!" – exclamation: subject + indicative)
 Venetian: Marco canta ben, dai! ("Mark (voc.) sing well, come on!" – command: vocative+imperative)
 Ven.Ital.: Marco canta ben, dai! (both exclamative and imperative)
 Std.Ital.: Marco canta bene, dai! (both exclamative and imperative)

Indeed, the verbal forms requiring subject clitics can often change or even drop their endings without problems of confusion because the clitic itself provide the necessary information (in Piedmontese and Milanese the clitic is not sufficient to mark the verb and often requires the cooccurence of a specific ending). Because Venetian subject clitics mark number (e.g. te = 2nd singular, el = 3rd singular, i = 3rd plural) and gender (ła = feminine 3rd singular, łe = feminine 3rd plural), they convey specific information that is not (or might not be) present on the endings. Thus, they act like a bridge that provide number and gender agreement between verb and subject (some languages, like Hebrew or Basque may show number/gender agreement on verbal endings). Thus, although some traditional grammars consider subject clitics as "redundant" or "pleonastic" elements, Venetian subject clitics are neither redundant nor pleonastic.

The clitics are the same in whole Veneto with two exceptions: te becomes ti in Venice (but is different from emphatic TI!) and becomes tu in some bellunese areas. El becomes Al in bellunese.

2nd singular person present indicative of "magnar"
 Venetian in Venice: (TI) ti magni  (lit." (You) you eat")
 Venetian in Padua-Vicenza-Rovigo-Verona: (TI) te magni  (=lit. "(You) you eat")
 Venetian in Treviso-Belluno: (TI) te magna  (=lit. "(You) you eat")

2nd singular person imperf. indicative of "magnar"
 Venetian in Venice: (TI) ti magnavi (lit. "(You) you used to eat")
 Venetian in Pad-Vic-Rov-Ver: (TI) te magnavi (lit. "(You) you used to eat")
 Venetian in Treviso-Belluno: (TI) te/tu magnava/magnéa (lit. "(You) you used to eat")

2nd singular person present indicative of "sentir"
 Venetian in Venice-Verona: (TI) te/ti senti   (lit. "(You) you hear/you feel")
 Venetian in Vic-Pad-Rov: (TI) te sinti  (lit. "(You) you hear/you feel")
 Venetian in Treviso: (TI) te sente  (lit. "(You) you hear/you feel")
 Venetian in Belluno: (TI) te/tu sent  (lit. "(You) you hear/you feel")

3rd singular person present indicative of "sentir"
 Venetian Ven-Ver-Vic-Pad-Rov: (EL CAN) el sente (lit. "(The dog) he hears/he feels")
 Venetian Trev-Bell: (EL CAN) el/al sent  (lit. "(The dog) he hears/he feels")

Such variations in last and internal vowels do not block reciprocal comprehension between people in Veneto because what is felt as important to mark the verb is the clitic ("te, el").

Also general Venetian forms exist with no endings:
 Venetian (in whole Veneto): te vien / ti vien ("you come")
 Venetian (in whole Veneto): el vien (lit. "he come" as there was no -s)
 Venetian (in whole Veneto): i vien ("they come")

Note that when the subject is postverbal (motion verbs, unaccusative verbs) the clitic is banned and the past participle of compound forms (if any) is invariably masc.singular, yielding a semi-impersonal form which does not exist in Italian:

Normal form
 Italian: Le mie sorelle sono arrivate ("[as for] My sisters have arrived-f.pl.")
 Venetian: Mé sorełe łe xe/è rivàe (lit."[as for] My sisters they-cl.f.pl. have arrived-f.pl.")

Impersonal form (only in Venetian)
 Italian: Sono arrivate le mie sorelle (hey, the news! "my sisters have arrived")
 Venetian: Xe/Gh'è/Iè rivà mé sorełe (lit. "(there) has arrived-m.sg. my sisters") --- no clitic and an invariable m.sg. past participle

In Italian the past participle is always inflected while in the Venetian in the impersonal form it is invariable and the verb has no plural (fem.) clitic, differently from the normal flection.

Bibliography

 
 
 

Venetian language
Italic grammars